Wirth is a German surname which may refer to any of the following individuals:

Business, politics, and military 
 Andrew Wirth (born 1963), American businessman
 Christian Wirth (1885–1944), German Nazi SS concentration camp commander involved in the Action T4 program and Operation Reinhard
 Christian Wirth (politician) (born 1963), German politician
 Conrad L. Wirth (1899–1993), American administrator
John L. Wirth (1917–1945), American Naval officer
 Joseph Wirth (1879–1956), Chancellor and Finance Minister of Germany
 Kelley Wirth, American politician
 Theodore Wirth (1863–1949), Swiss-American horticulturalist
 Tim Wirth (born 1939), former United States Senator and leader of the United Nations Foundation

Arts, media and television 
 Ann Fisher-Wirth (born 1947), American poet and university professor
 Billy Wirth (born 1962), American actor
 Dawn Wirth (born 1960), American photographer
 Emanuel Wirth (1842–1923), German violinist
 Franz Peter Wirth (1919–1999), German film director and screenwriter
 George Wirth (born 1947), American singer-songwriter
 Hana Wirth-Nesher (born 1948), Israeli literary scholar and university professor
 Herman Wirth (1885–1981), Dutch-German historian
 RaD Man (born Christian Wirth), computer art historian and founder of ACiD Productions
 Iwan Wirth (born 1970), Swiss art dealer
 James Jeffrey Wirth (born 1990), American drag queen
 Max Wirth (1822–1900), German journalist and economist
 May Wirth (1894–1978), Australian circus and vaudeville performer

Sports
 Alan Wirth (born 1956), American baseball pitcher
 Andreas Wirth (born 1984), German racing driver
 Christina Wirth (born 1987), American basketball player
 Derek Wirth (born 1978), Australian rules footballer
 Enrique Wirth, Argentine athlete
 Günther Wirth (born 1933), German footballer who played striker
 Janina Wirth (born 1966), German figure skater
 Karl-Heinz Wirth (born 1944), German footballer who played defender
 Max Wirth (cyclist) (born 1930), Swiss cyclist
 Nolan Wirth (born 1995), Canadian soccer player
 Orlando Wirth (born 1981), Dutch footballer
 Oscar Wirth (born 1955), Chilean footballer who played goalkeeper
 Patrick Wirth (born 1971), Austrian alpine skier
 Rainer Wirth (born 1982), Chilean footballer who plays goalkeeper
 Senaida Wirth (1926–1967), American baseball player
 Siegbert Wirth, American footballer (soccer)

Science and engineering
 Dyann Wirth, American immunologist
 Wilhelm Wirth (1876–1952), German psychologist
 Willis Wagner Wirth (1916–1994), American entomologist
 Niklaus Wirth (born 1934), Swiss computer scientist, designer of several programming languages
 Hugh Wirth (1939–2018), Australian veterinarian
 Nick Wirth (born 1966), British automotive engineer

Other
 James Wirth (1830–1871), German Roman Catholic religious brother
 John Wirth (historian) (1936–2002), American historian and university professor
 Louis Wirth (1897–1952), American sociologist of German origin and member of the Chicago School
 Oswald Wirth (1860–1943), Swiss tarot writer and occultist
 Theodore Wirth (1863–1949), Swiss-born, horticulturalist, architect of Minneapolis park system

See also
 Jacob Wirth Restaurant, a German-American restaurant and bar in Boston, Massachusetts
 Wirths (surname)
 Wirth Lake (disambiguation)
 Wirt (disambiguation)
 
 

German-language surnames